Perch Rock may refer to:

 A rock outcrop in Liverpool Bay off the coast of New Brighton, Merseyside
 Fort Perch Rock, a 19th century fort on Perch Rock
 Perch Rock Lighthouse, a lighthouse on Perch Rock